Hezari (also Romanized as Hezārī and Hazari) is a village in Bahu Kalat Rural District, Dashtiari District, Chabahar County, Sistan and Baluchestan Province, Iran. At the 2006 census, its population was 205, in 27 families.

References 

Populated places in Chabahar County